Francesca Lollobrigida (born 7 February 1991) is an Italian speed skater. She was born in Frascati. She competed at the 2014 Winter Olympics in Sochi, where she placed 23rd in the 3000 meters. Actress Gina Lollobrigida was her grand-aunt.

Lollobrigida is the current holder of the Italian records on 3000 and 5000 metres.

She won a silver medal and a bronze in speed skating at the 2022 Winter Olympics.

Lollobrigida has won several championship medals in inline speed skating.

Speed skating

Personal records

References

External links

1991 births
Living people
People from Frascati
Italian female speed skaters
Inline speed skaters
Olympic speed skaters of Italy
Speed skaters at the 2014 Winter Olympics
Speed skaters at the 2018 Winter Olympics
Speed skaters at the 2022 Winter Olympics
Medalists at the 2022 Winter Olympics
Olympic medalists in speed skating
Olympic silver medalists for Italy
Olympic bronze medalists for Italy
Competitors at the 2017 World Games
Competitors at the 2013 Winter Universiade
Universiade bronze medalists for Italy
Universiade medalists in speed skating
Sportspeople from the Metropolitan City of Rome Capital